Top Chef Masters is an American reality competition series that aired on the cable television network Bravo, and premiered June 10, 2009. It is a spinoff of Bravo's hit show Top Chef. In the series, chefs compete against each other in weekly challenges. The show is different from Top Chef, which typically features younger professional cooks who are still rising in the food service industry.

Seasons

References

External links
Official website
 
 

 
Bravo (American TV network) original programming
Cooking competitions in the United States
2000s American cooking television series
2010s American cooking television series
2009 American television series debuts
2013 American television series endings
English-language television shows
Reality television spin-offs
Television series by Magical Elves
American television spin-offs